"Humble" (stylized as "HUMBLE.") is a song by American rapper Kendrick Lamar. It was released on March 30, 2017, by Top Dawg Entertainment, Aftermath Entertainment and Interscope Records. The song was written by Lamar and producers Mike Will Made It and Pluss.  It was provided to rhythmic contemporary radio as the lead single from Lamar's fourth studio album, Damn. "Humble" is Lamar's second number-one single on the US Billboard Hot 100 after "Bad Blood" and his first as a lead artist. The song received four nominations at the 60th Annual Grammy Awards, including for Record of the Year, Best Rap Performance, Best Rap Song, and Best Music Video, winning in the last three categories.

Recording
"Humble" was the first song to be recorded for Damn. The beat for "Humble" was developed by Mike Will Made It, with the intention of recording the song with Gucci Mane. However, the song was later shown to Lamar. After recording, it was initially agreed upon that it would be released on Mike Will Made's debut album Ransom 2, but others convinced Lamar to keep it for his upcoming album.

Critical reception
On the day of its release Pitchfork named it Best New Track, noting that, "[Humble] is a hard-nosed G check of his lessers, that pivots into imperfect critiques of beauty standards". NPR's Andrew Flanagan thought, "the song, less exploration of contrition on the part of Lamar than an instruction to his peers, picks up a thread NPR Music first examined following that album teaser: how the 'best rapper alive' might explore the theme of God, religion and personal growth." For Alex Young of Consequence of Sound, "it's got all the ingredients of a proper lead single: a Mike WiLL Made It-produced beat built on piano and 808 bass, a chorus you can spit along to ('Sit down/ Be humble'), and shoutouts to Grey Poupon and the former president." Writing for The Guardian, Harriet Gibson explained how the song is, "sparse and rigid, beginning with the crunching swipes of an electric guitar, and is led by beats and sinister stabs of piano. It is a showcase for his authoritative lyricism and preacher-like message, while the instrumentation is far from the complex jazz and funk sounds of To Pimp a Butterfly... In fact, Humble has more in common with grime's minimalism than it does the vintage stylings of his recent output."

Entertainment Weekly labelled it the best song of the year. Rolling Stone considered it the third-best, and  Billboard the sixth. In 2018, Billboard ranked the song number one on their list of the 20 greatest Kendrick Lamar songs, and in 2021, Rolling Stone ranked the song number eight on their list of the 50 greatest Kendrick Lamar songs.

Chart performance
"Humble" debuted at number two and later peaked at number one on the US Billboard Hot 100, becoming Lamar's first number one and highest-charting single as a lead artist, surpassing "Swimming Pools (Drank)", which peaked at number 17 in 2012. It is his second number one single overall after "Bad Blood", by Taylor Swift featuring Lamar. It is also his fourth top 10 single, and marked the highest debut for a hip hop song since "Love the Way You Lie" by Eminem featuring Rihanna. Selling well over 111,000 copies in its first week, "Humble" became Kendrick Lamar's second number one on the Digital Songs chart, following "Bad Blood". The song was at number 1 on the Hot 100 for one week but got replaced by Bruno Mars song That's What I Like on May 1st, 2017. The song spent its first 15 weeks in the top 10 of the Hot 100, before dropping to number 11 on the week dated August 5, 2017. "Humble" is the only rap song in 2017 to sell over 1,000,000 digital copies and its certified 7× platinum in the United States.

The song also peaked at number one in New Zealand, number two in Australia (where it was later voted into first place in the Triple J Hottest 100, 2017) and Canada, and reached the top 10 in Ireland and the UK.

Music video

Directed by Dave Meyers and The Little Homies and released on March 30, 2017, on Kendrick Lamar's Vevo account, the song's accompanying music video starts with Lamar dressed like the pope in a cope, before then showing Lamar in all black lying on a table of money, "ignorantly" shooting loads of bills from a cash cannon. It also features a reenactment of Leonardo da Vinci's 15th-century painting, The Last Supper, with Lamar sitting in Jesus' chair as his disciples "unappreciatively" gorge on wine and bread. He is also seen teeing off on top of a car, passing mustard between cars mimicking a Grey Poupon commercial and at one point the top of his head is in flames. Fellow TDE rapper Jay Rock and producer Sounwave appear in the video alongside other TDE members.

Reviewing the music video, Billboard editor Brad Wete thought it "is a poignant exercise in irony and is also filled with messaging that could be perceived as anti-conformist." He concluded saying "His raps are filterless; he tells it like it is. So it's no surprise that this dynamic video is essentially what Lamar is as an artist: balanced with a clear message." Althea Legaspi of Rolling Stone described it as "richly symbolic." For Harriet Gibson of The Guardian, "the brilliantly cinematic video, with its fish-eye lens and cartoonish stylising, recalls classic Hype Williams, and leads the viewer through these passages of assignation, fleshing out Lamar's ideas. It breathes life into a song that would hardly be considered his greatest creation, but neatly lays out a mood of intent." Matt Miller of Esquire opined about the rapper's videography: "in recent years, Kendrick Lamar has revived the music video as a powerful form of social commentary." The music video has ammased over 900 million views on YouTube, becoming Lamars' most viewed video on his channel.

Nominated for eight categories at the 2017 MTV Video Music Awards, "Humble" won six, including Video of the Year.

Usage in media
ESPN and ABC used the song, along with "DNA" and "Loyalty", as their lead song for their NBA Playoff coverage.

The 21st season premiere of South Park, "White People Renovating Houses", featured a character performing the song in a country-style parody. The song is also heard in other television shows such as Skam and Black-ish.

"Humble" is featured and remixed in YouTube Rewind: The Shape of 2017. "Humble" is also featured on NBA 2K18’s in-game soundtrack.

The song was sampled by Eminem for the track "Greatest" on his 2018 album Kamikaze.

A remix of the song is also featured in the teaser trailer for Shazam!.

The song was featured in the Super Bowl LVI halftime show trailer, but was not performed during its halftime show.

Remixes
Many remixes have been made, including by singer Ne-Yo, released on May 3, 2017, and by electronic dance music producer Skrillex, released on September 22, 2017.

Live performances 
Lamar performed "Humble" live as a closer at the Coachella Valley Music and Arts Festival on April 23, 2017. Lamar has also performed "Humble" on the Damn tour. Lamar performed the song during his 2017 MTV Video Music Awards. Lamar also performed the song as part of his special performance at halftime of the 2018 College Football Playoff National Championship Game.

Awards

Track listing

Credits and personnel
Credits adapted from the official Damn digital booklet.
Kendrick Lamar – songwriter
Mike Will Made It – songwriter, producer
Matt Schaeffer – guitar
Derek Ali – mixing
Tyler Page – mix assistant
Cyrus Taghipour – mix assistant
Derrick McCall – assistant

Charts

Weekly charts

Year-end charts

Decade-end charts

Certifications

Release history

See also
 List of number-one singles from the 2010s (New Zealand)
 List of number-one urban singles of 2017 (Australia)
 List of number-one streaming tracks of 2017 (Australia)
 List of Billboard Hot 100 number-one singles of 2017
 List of number-one R&B/hip-hop songs of 2017 (U.S.)
 List of Billboard Rhythmic number-one songs of the 2010s

References

2017 songs
2017 singles
Kendrick Lamar songs
Songs written by Kendrick Lamar
Song recordings produced by Mike Will Made It
Songs written by Mike Will Made It
Top Dawg Entertainment singles
Aftermath Entertainment singles
Interscope Records singles
Billboard Hot 100 number-one singles
Number-one singles in New Zealand
Music videos directed by Dave Meyers (director)
MTV Video of the Year Award
MTV Video Music Award for Best Direction
Grammy Award for Best Rap Performance
Grammy Award for Best Short Form Music Video
Songs written by Asheton Hogan